Operation Stand Down is a United States non-profit organization providing social services to United States Armed Forces veterans, helping them transition into civilian life. It has chapters across the United States, with one in Nashville, Tennessee, among the most prominent.

External links

Home pages and information on Operation Stand Down in:
 Nashville, Tennessee
 Rhode Island
 Massachusetts

References

United States military support organizations
Non-profit organizations based in the United States